The 1917 Great Lakes Navy Bluejackets football team ("Jackies") represented the Great Lakes Naval Station, the United States Navy's boot camp located near North Chicago, Illinois, during the 1917 college football season. Led by head coach, Lieutenant E. D. Angell, the team compiled a 4–3 record.

Several former Michigan Wolverines played for the Great Lakes team, including fullback Cedric "Pat" Smith, guards Albert Benbrook and Alvin Loucks, and halfback Philip Raymond. Minnesota native Hal Erickson also starred at halfback for Great Lakes.

John Philip Sousa was commissioned as a lieutenant in the Navy in 1917 and assigned to the Great Lakes Naval Station where he led the Great Lakes Band. Prior to kickoff of the Thanksgiving Day game at Stagg Field, Sousa led the band of 400 men in renditions of Sousa's "El Capitan" march and "The Star-Spangled Banner". At halftime, the band followed with "America, Here's My Boy" and "Joan of Arc". When the crowd called out for "Over There", the band complied, and the Great Lakes sailors responded with a snake dance on the field. At the end of the game, a 27–0 victory for Great Lakes, the band played "Chopin's Funeral March" for the Fort Sheridan team.

Schedule

References

Great Lakes Navy
Great Lakes Navy Bluejackets football seasons
Great Lakes Navy Bluejackets football